The 26th Legislative Assembly of Quebec was the political provincial legislature in Quebec, Canada that was elected in the 1960 Quebec general election.  It sat from 20 September 1960 to 22 September 1960, from 10 November 1960 to 10 June 1961, and from 9 January 1962 to 19 September 1962.  The Quebec Liberal Party led by Jean Lesage began the Quiet Revolution reforms. The Union Nationale, which had previously governed for more than 15 years, formed the official opposition under successive interim leaders Yves Prévost and Antonio Talbot, and then under Daniel Johnson, Sr. The Legislature lasted only two years as Lesage called the 1962 election as a referendum for the nationalization of hydroelectricity under Hydro-Québec.

Seats per political party

 After the 1960 elections

Member list

This was the list of members of the Legislative Assembly of Quebec that were elected in the 1960 election:

Other elected MLAs

Other MLAs were elected during this mandate in by-elections

 Gaston Lambert, Quebec Liberal Party, Joliette, November 23, 1960 
 François Boulais, Quebec Liberal Party, Rouville, November 23, 1960 
 Pierre Laporte, Quebec Liberal Party, Chambly, December 14, 1961 
 Marie-Claire Kirkland, Quebec Liberal Party, Jacques-Cartier, December 14, 1961

Cabinet Ministers

 Prime Minister and Executive Council President: Jean Lesage
 Vice-President of the Executive Council: Georges-Émile Lapalme
 Agriculture: Alcide Courcy (1960–1962)
 Colonization: Alcide Courcy (1960–1962)
 Agriculture and Colonization: Alcide Courcy (1962)
 Labour: René Hamel
 Public Works: René Lévesque (1960–1961), René Saint-Pierre (1961–1962)
 Cultural Affairs: Georges-Émile Lapalme (1961–1962)
 Social Welfare: Émilien Lafrance (1960–1961)
 Family and Social Welfare: Émilien Lafrance (1961–1962)
 Youth: Paul Gérin-Lajoie
 Health: Alphonse Couturier
 Lands and Forests: Bona Arsenault
 Fisheries and Hunting: Gérard D. Levesque
 Mines: Paul Earl (1960–1961)
 Hydraulic resources: René Lévesque (1960–1961)
 Natural Ressources: René Lévesque (1961–1962)
 Roads: Bernard Pinard
 Transportation and Communications: Gérard Cournoyer
 Municipal Affairs: René Hamel (1960–1961), Lucien Cliche (1961–1962)
 Federal-provincial Affairs: Jean Lesage (1961–1962)
 Industry and Commerce: André Rousseau
 Attorney General: Georges-Émile Lapalme
 Provincial Secretary: Lionel Bertrand
 Finances: Jean Lesage
 Revenu: Paul Earl (1961–1962)
 State Ministers: George Carlyle Marler, Charles-Aimé Kirkland

References
 1960 election results
 List of historical Cabinet Ministers

Notes

26